The Porce III Dam is an embankment dam on the Porce River  northeast of Medellín in Antioquia Department, Colombia. The dam was constructed between 2004 and 2011 for the primary purpose of hydroelectric power generation.

Background
Between 1974 and 1976, hydrological studies were carried out on the Porce River and between 1982 and 1983, studies regarding the river's hydroelectric development were completed. The study recommended the five projects, Porce I, Porce II, Porce III, Porce IV and Ermitaño. In December 1984, the feasibility report for Porce III was submitted and complementary studies were carried out between 1986 and 1996. In 2002, the design and consultancy contracts were awarded along with the environmental license issued. In 2004, construction on the dam began and the river was diverted by 2007. By 2010, the dam began to impound the reservoir and was complete by 2010. Between 2011, all four generators were commissioned.

Design and operation
The dam's spillway is a chute-type and is located on its left side. At the end of the lower headrace, it converts into four penstocks to supply each of the underground power house's  Francis turbines with water.

See also

List of power stations in Colombia

References

Dams completed in 2011
Energy infrastructure completed in 2010
Energy infrastructure completed in 2011
Dams in Colombia
Hydroelectric power stations in Colombia
Concrete-face rock-fill dams
Buildings and structures in Antioquia Department
Underground power stations